The Church of the Gesú is a Roman Catholic chapel and former parish church located in Philadelphia, Pennsylvania. Founded in 1868 by Burchard Villiger, the church was the center of several Jesuit educational institutions, including St. Joseph's Preparatory School, St. Joseph's University, and the Gesú School. The Baroque revival church was named after and loosely modeled after the Church of the Gesú in Rome. The parish closed in 1993, and the building became the chapel of St. Joseph's Prep. The church is part of the Girard Avenue Historic District.

History 
On December 6, 1868, the Jesuit priest Burchard Villiger founded New St. Joseph's Church, being the second Jesuit Catholic church in Philadelphia after Old St. Joseph's Church in Old City. This was soon renamed the Church of the Holy Family, intending it to be the center of a complex of Jesuit institutions, including St. Joseph's Preparatory School, St. Joseph's University, and the Gesú School. A chapel, refectory, and parochial school were built following the relocation of the preparatory school and university from Old St. Joseph's Church in 1868.

The Church of the Holy Family was renamed the Church of the Gesú in 1878, after the Church of the Gesù in Rome, which is the universal mother church of the Society of Jesus. The cornerstone of a new, grander church was laid on March 10, 1879, and the cruciform edifice was completed in 1888. A dedication ceremony was held on December 12, 1888. The Baroque revival church was designed by local architect Edwin F. Durang, and was modeled on its Roman counterpart. The interior, including the murals, was decorated by the Italian artist Nicola D'Ascenzo.

The church was also outfitted by Villiger with a number of paintings, which included eighteen portraits by the Mexican painter Miguel Cabrera of the Jesuit Superiors General from Saint Ignatius through Lorenzo Ricci, as well as several saints. However, by 1903, these paintings were no longer in the church. By 1891, the church held over 370 relics for veneration by the faithful. Many of them were around 120 years old at the time they were obtained from Rome. The church served as a parish of the Archdiocese of Philadelphia from its opening until its closure in 1993 and merger with Saint Malachy's Church. The building was repurposed by St. Joseph's Prep as its school chapel.

In 1985, the building was named as a contributing property of the Girard Avenue Historic District.

References

Citations

Sources

External links 

Historic district contributing properties in Philadelphia
Former Roman Catholic church buildings in Pennsylvania
Roman Catholic chapels in the United States
1868 establishments in Pennsylvania
Religious organizations established in 1868
Roman Catholic churches completed in 1888
Roman Catholic Archdiocese of Philadelphia
Baroque Revival architecture in the United States
19th-century Roman Catholic church buildings in the Philippines